Maurice J. "Mac, M. J." McCauley (June 7, 1923 – December 8, 2013) was an American teacher and politician.

Born near Caledonia, Minnesota, McCauley served in the United States Marine Corps during World War II. McCauley went to University of Notre Dame and University of Minnesota. He received his bachelor's degree from University of Wisconsin–La Crosse and his master's degree from Arizona State University. He taught physics and science in junior and senior high school and at Winona State University. McCauley served as Houston County, Minnesota Clerk of Court, County Commissioner for Winona County, Minnesota and then served in the Minnesota House of Representatives from 1971 to 1977 from Winona County. McCauley was a Republican. McCauley died at his home in Winona, Minnesota.

Notes

1923 births
2013 deaths
People from Caledonia, Minnesota
People from Winona, Minnesota
University of Notre Dame alumni
University of Minnesota alumni
University of Wisconsin–La Crosse alumni
Arizona State University alumni
Winona State University faculty
County commissioners in Minnesota
Republican Party members of the Minnesota House of Representatives
United States Marine Corps personnel of World War II